Rock Is Dead, or Rock and Roll Is Dead, or similar may also refer to:

Music

Albums
 Rock Is Dead—Long Live Rock!, an unreleased 1972 album by The Who
 Rockisdead, a 2016 album by Dorothy
 Rock & Roll Is Dead, a 2005 album by The Hellacopters

Songs
 "Rock Is Dead" (The Doors song), 1969
 "Rock Is Dead" (Marilyn Manson song), 1998
 Rock Is Dead Tour, a 1999 concert tour by Marilyn Manson
 "Rock and Roll Is Dead", a 1995 song by Lenny Kravitz